Because of You is an album released by James Darren in 2001.

Track listing

Charts

References

2001 albums
James Darren albums